Árpád Basch (April 16, 1873, Budapest - 1944, Budapest) was a Hungarian painter and graphic artist.

Initially intending to follow an industrial career, Basch attended training at the Department of Metallurgy at the Staatliche Mittelschule (government school) for one year, after which he decided to become an artist.

He trained under Simon Hollósy in Munich, Bihari and Karlovsky in Budapest and Léon Bonnat, Dousset, and Jean Paul Laurens in Paris. He returned once more to Budapest, where he became the art editor of the Magyar Genius (a Hungarian publication). He painted several commissions for the Millennia Exposition, and devoted considerable attention to poster painting. He was a collaborator on "The Poster" and on "Les Maîtres de l'Affiche", but his principal occupation was water-color decorative painting.

Sources
Ferencz Herceg: Szelek szárnyán 1905

See also
Basch
Gyula Basch

Hungarian poster artists
1873 births
1944 deaths
Artists from Budapest
20th-century Hungarian painters
20th-century Hungarian male artists
Hungarian male painters
Austro-Hungarian painters